Afaesetiti Amosa (born 11 October 1990) is a Samoan rugby player for Aviron Bayonnais in France's Top 14, the highest level of French rugby. His primary position is number 8.

Career
Born in Samoa Amosa moved to Australia at the age of four, and played his junior rugby for Moorabin Rugby Club in Melbourne, featured for the Brumbies Academy side before returning to Melbourne to play for the Melbourne Rebels academy side.

In August 2012 Amosa moved to Bizkaia Gernika in Spain's División de Honor de Rugby, they also competed in the 2012–13 European Challenge Cup where Amosa played in 6 games. He caught the eye of US Colomiers' coach Bernard Goutta and moved to the Pro D2 side that summer.  After two years in Colomiers he was due to sign for Toulon, but the transfer fell through and in September 2015 after starting the season with Colomiers he moved to Top 14 side La Rochelle.

On 25 March 2018 it was announced he had signed for Union Bordeaux Bègles on a two-year contract.

On 15 February 2021  it was announced he had signed for Aviron Bayonnais as medikal joker to help staying the club on Top14 ( actually they are in the thirteenth place ). In his first match  against the  Toulon, Afa made a try and the basque club won the match.

On 23 August 2019, Amosa was named in Samoa's 34-man training squad for the 2019 Rugby World Cup, before being named in the final 31 on 31 August.

References

External links
 

1990 births
Living people
Samoan rugby union players
Union Bordeaux Bègles players
Stade Rochelais players
Aviron Bayonnais players
Rugby union number eights
Samoan expatriate rugby union players
Expatriate rugby union players in France
Samoan emigrants to Australia
Samoa international rugby union players
Expatriate rugby union players in Spain
Samoan expatriate sportspeople in Spain
Australian rugby union players
US Colomiers players